Sim Jae-young (born 14 September 1995) is a South Korean taekwondo athlete. She is the double world champion of the finweight category as she won the championship in 2017 and 2019.

In 2021, she competed in the women's 49 kg event at the 2020 Summer Olympics held in Tokyo, Japan where she was eliminated in her second match.

References

External links

1995 births
Living people
South Korean female taekwondo practitioners
World Taekwondo Championships medalists
Taekwondo practitioners at the 2020 Summer Olympics
Olympic taekwondo practitioners of South Korea
21st-century South Korean women